Otter Rapids Generating Station is a dam and hydroelectric power plant located in Pitt Township in the Unorganized North Part of Cochrane District in Northeastern Ontario, Canada. Owned by Ontario Power Generation, this 4-unit, 182 MW station is part of the Northeast Plant Group.  The Ontario Northland Railway runs past this facility.

Preliminary surveys of the site were conducted in 1945. In 1951 additional site information was gathered with studies and estimates refined. Approval under the Navigable Waters Protection Act was received in October 1958 and the first generating unit came online on September 26, 1961.

The Otter Rapids Generating Station was the last of four generating stations completed on the Abitibi River in the James Bay watershed.

A community of employees and their families inhabited the adjacent colony called Otter Rapids. This community of over 1,000 people was well equipped with a bank, post office, snack bar, grocery store, billiard hall, bowling alley, curling rink, hockey rink, fire hall, 10-bed hospital and auditorium.

See also 

 List of generating stations in Canada
 List of generating stations in Ontario

References

External links

Hydroelectric power stations in Ontario
Energy infrastructure completed in 1961
Energy infrastructure completed in 1963
Ontario Hydro
Ontario Power Generation
Dams in Ontario